Carmelite Monastery (Sisters of Mercy Convent) is a historic monastery at 400 E. Carpenter Street in Stanton, Texas.

It was built in 1882 and added to the National Register of Historic Places in 1999.

The property was also designated a Recorded Texas Historic Landmark.

See also

National Register of Historic Places listings in Martin County, Texas
Recorded Texas Historic Landmarks in Martin County

References

Roman Catholic churches in Texas
Carmelite monasteries in the United States
Convents in the United States
Properties of religious function on the National Register of Historic Places in Texas
Buildings and structures in Martin County, Texas
Recorded Texas Historic Landmarks
National Register of Historic Places in Martin County, Texas